Mordellistena zoltani is a species of beetle in the genus Mordellistena of the family Mordellidae. It was discovered in 1977 and can be found in Croatia and Hungary.

References

zoltani
Beetles described in 1977
Beetles of Europe